John Young (born 1889; date of death unknown) was a Scottish footballer who played as a centre-forward for Bradford City, Sunderland, Port Vale and Hamilton Academical in the 1910s.

Career
Young won junior honours for Scotland whilst leading the forward line at Burnbank Athletic. He was hailed as the next Jimmy Quinn by the Athletic News upon joining Bradford City in April 1910, and scored eight goals in ten First Division appearances for the "Bantams". His performances at Valley Parade attracted interest from Sunderland, and he joined the "Black Cats" in November 1911. He scored on his debut for the "Wearsiders" against West Bromwich Albion at Roker Park on 9 December, but left the club at the end of the 1911–12 season after scoring only one further goal in his next 14 appearances.

He joined Port Vale in the summer of 1912. His debut came in a 5–0 defeat at Stalybridge Celtic in a Central League match on 3 September 1912; the awful result was compounded by the twisted knee he gained during the match which caused him to be stretchered off and sidelined him for much of the autumn. After being declared fit again in November 1913 he scored eleven goals in his next nineteen games, but was released at the end of the season. He returned to Scotland and scored one goal in four Division One games for Hamilton Academical in the 1913–14 season.

Career statistics
Source:

References

1889 births
Year of death missing
Footballers from Hamilton, South Lanarkshire
Scottish footballers
Association football forwards
Burnbank Athletic F.C. players
Bradford City A.F.C. players
Sunderland A.F.C. players
Port Vale F.C. players
Hamilton Academical F.C. players
English Football League players
Scottish Football League players
Scottish Junior Football Association players